Metopocoilus is a genus of beetles in the family Cerambycidae, containing the following species:

 Metopocoilus corumbaensis Lane, 1956
 Metopocoilus giganteus Nonfried, 1894
 Metopocoilus longissimum (Tippmann, 1953)
 Metopocoilus maculicollis Audinet-Serville, 1832
 Metopocoilus picticornis Melzer, 1923
 Metopocoilus quadrispinosus (Buquet, 1860)
 Metopocoilus rojasi Sallé, 1853

References

Trachyderini
Cerambycidae genera